Mount Nimba Strict Nature Reserve is a protected area and UNESCO World Heritage Site located in both Guinea and Côte d'Ivoire, extending over a total of area of , with  in Guinea, and  in Côte d'Ivoire. The reserve covers significant portions of the Nimba Range, a geographically unique area with unusually rich flora and fauna, including exceptional numbers of single-site endemic species, such as Nimbaphrynoides (a genus of viviparous toads), the Nimba otter shrew, and multiple species of horseshoe bats. Its highest peak is Mount Richard-Molard at 1,752 m (5,750 ft), which is the highest peak of both countries.

History
The strict nature reserve was established in 1943 by Order No. 4190 SE/F in Côte d'Ivoire and in 1944 by decree in Guinea. The Guinean part was accepted as a biosphere reserve in 1980. Both reserves were combined to form one World Heritage Site in 1981 (Guinea) and 1982 (Côte d'Ivoire) because of its outstanding biodiversity and unique mosaic of tropical habitats. Iron-ore exploration for mining in the most vulnerable montane zone started in 1992, and the reserve has been listed as a World Heritage Site in danger since then. For the sake of an improved protection, a conservation management centre is being built by Guinean Parks Foundation. The project was approved by the Guinean Government and CEGENS in 2016.

Geography 
The Nimba Range is a narrow ridge extending approximately 40 km long, with an orientation of northeast–southwest; it forms a part of the southern extent of the Guinea Highlands. Its highest peak is Mount Richard-Molard at 1,752 m (5,750 ft). Other peaks include Grand Rochers at 1694 m (5558 ft), Mont Sempéré at 1682 m (5518 ft), Mont Piérré Richaud at 1670 m (5479 ft), Mont Tô at 1675 m (5495 ft), and Mont LeClerc 1577 m (5174 ft). All of them are located in the Guinean part of the reserve. There are about fifty springs, including the origins of the Cavally, Cestos, and Sassandra Rivers. Mining of top-quality iron-ore poses the major threat to the unique geomorphology and wildlife.

Climate 
The Nimba Range has a sub-equatorial montane climate. Temperature changes extremely with altitude, with a daytime maximum ranging between 24 °C and 33 °C, and the nightly minimum  can fall below 10 °C. Some parts of the reserve receive significantly less precipitation, due to rain-shadow effect of the high ridge. In general, southern slopes are moister than the leeward northern ones which are affected by dry Harmattan wind from the Sahara. The Nimba Range, as well as the reserve has exceptional microclimatic diversity.

Ecology 

Mount Nimba Strict Nature Reserve lies within the Guinean Forests of West Africa Biodiversity Hotspot. It harbours an especially rich flora and fauna, and it is the home of more than 2000 vascular plant species, 317 vertebrate species, 107 of which are mammals, and to more than 2,500 invertebrate species. The reserve is a subject of biological surveys, because there are still large numbers of unknown species. Vertebrates endemic to the reserve include the Nimba viviparous toad (Nimbaphrynoides occidentalis), Lamotte's roundleaf bat (Hipposideros lamottei), and Nimba otter shrew (Micropotamogale lamottei). Other rare and endangered animals foudn within the reserve include the West African lion (Panthera leo senegalensis), pygmy hippopotamus (Choeropsis liberiensis), zebra duiker (Cephalophus zebra), and a population of western chimpanzee (Pan troglodytes verus) that use stones for tools.

Terrestrial ecoregions within the reserve include Western Guinean lowland forest, Guinean montane forest, Guinean forest-savanna mosaic, and West Sudanian savanna. The Nimba Range is a part of a distinct freshwater ecoregion with a high portion of endemic aquatic species.

Terrestrial vegetation varies with altitude and cardinal orientation.
 The mountain is isolated from other sky islands of Forest Guinea by the lowland West Sudanian savanna and Guinean forest-savannah mosaic. Savanna habitats are broken by gallery forests and closed canopy forest islands.
 The lowland foothills are covered by the Western Guinean Lowland Forest up to 600 meters. The characteristic forest type is semi-deciduous high forest with a main canopy and an emergent layer. There are 40-70 tree species found in a single hectare, and up to 500 forest tree species recorded in the area.
 Guinean Montane Forests are located between 600 and 1200–1400 meters. At lower levels, semi-deciduous high forests extend up to 900 meters; they are poorer in species compared to lowlands. Short dry forests can be found in the eastern end of the ridge. From 900 meters altitude, where the mountain is covered by clouds almost most of the year, mossy forests are present, which can be divided into three types: Parinari exclesa forests (1), summit forests (2), and tree fern forests in the valleys where ground water is abundant (3). Above the tree zone, there is a transition of Protea bushland to grassland.
 Isolated high-altitude grassland extends from 1200 to 1400 meters to the highest peaks. There is the most famous endemic vertebrates are the Nimba viviparous toad (Nimbaphrynoides occidentalis), and the Lamotte's roundleaf bat (Hipposideros lamottei), the latter recorded from only one mining site. Endemic plants include among others Asplenium schnellii, Osbeckia porteresii and Blaeria nimbana.

Tourism 
Mount Nimba lies in remote region along the tri-nation border of Guinea, Côte d'Ivoire, and Liberia, far from their capital cities. In fact, the Liberian part of the mountain is greatly degraded due to former mining activities. However, the Guinean half of the ridge is highly protected; and therefore this part is still characterized by intact montane ecosystems, and unique species assemblage (as well as the smallest, Ivorian section). To visit the strict nature reserve is the best choice from Guinea, where a local tour operator organizes guided tours from Conakry.

Trivia
One of the four honey buzzards of Kempen-Broek that are equipped with GPS trackers passed this national park on 13 November 2013.

Gallery

See also 
 Nimba Range
 Mount Richard-Molard
 Wildlife of Guinea
 Wildlife of Ivory Coast
Forest Guinea

References

External links
 UNESCO Mount Nimba Strict Nature Reserve Site
 Mount Nimba Strict Nature Reserve, Guinea and Côte d'Ivoire (UNESCO MAB Biosphere Reserves Directory)
 Mount Nimba Strict Nature Reserve, Guinea and Côte d'Ivoire (African World Heritage Sites)
 Mount Nimba Strict Nature Reserve, Guinea and Côte d'Ivoire (Encyclopedia of Earth)
 Mount Nimba (Freshwater Ecoregions of the World)
 APES MAPPER
 WCMC Natural Site Data Sheet
Act Establishing East Nimba Nature Reserve - Republic of Liberia
Guinean Safari Services (the only tour operator, which organizes one-day hikings to the mountain)

Biosphere reserves of Guinea
Guinean montane forests
Nimba
Nimba
Nzérékoré Region
Protected areas of Guinea
Protected areas of Ivory Coast
World Heritage Sites in Guinea
World Heritage Sites in Ivory Coast
Protected areas established in 1943
Transboundary protected areas